Fabien Laurenti (born 6 January 1983) is a French former professional footballer who played as a defender.

Career
Born in Marseille, Laurenti began his career at Olympique de Marseille. Limited playing time there inspired a move in 2004 to AC Ajaccio, where he made over 100 appearances. In the summer of 2007, he left Ajaccio for RC Lens. On 8 January 2010, Ligue 2 club Stade Brestois 29 signed Laurenti on loan until June 2010 from Lens.

Between 2003 and 2004, he made three appearances for the France U21 team.

References

External links
 
 
 
 

1983 births
Living people
Footballers from Marseille
Association football defenders
French footballers
Ligue 1 players
Ligue 2 players
Olympique de Marseille players
AC Ajaccio players
RC Lens players
AC Arlésien players
France youth international footballers